Shaktinagar may refer to:
Shaktinagar, Uttar Pradesh, India
Shaktinagar, Karnataka, India
Shakti nagar, Delhi, India